Low Tide is an 2019 American drama film.

Low Tide may also refer to:

Low tide, when the water in a tide stops falling
Lowtide, an Australian indie rock band formed in 2008
Lowtide (album), 2014
Low Tides (album), by This Wild Life, 2016

See also